Rothia  is a Gram-positive, aerobic, rod-shaped and non-motile bacterial genus from the family Micrococcaceae. Rothia bacteria can cause disease in humans and immunosuppressed humans. 

Rothia is prevalent in our saliva and it produces enterobactin. This is a strong iron-binding siderophore, which is produced by E. coli. Rothia is also prevalent in our gut and causes the emergence of gastric atrophy and intestinal metaplasia.

References

Further reading
 
 

Micrococcaceae
Bacteria genera